= My Suicide Story =

American documentary series

- Promotional poster
- Genre: Docuseries
- Created by: Joe Massa
- Directed by: Joe Massa
- Country of origin: United States
- Original language: English
- No. of seasons: 1
- No. of episodes: 11

Production
- Executive producer: Christian Massa
- Running time: 8-30 mins

Original release
- Network: YouTube
- Release: July 22, 2018

My Suicide Story is an American documentary series created and directed by Joe Massa. The series features survivors of attempted suicide who share their stories of survival and triumph over their suicide attempts. It premiered on July 22, 2018, on YouTube.
